Evangelos Damaskos was a Greek pole vaulter. He was born in Acharnes, Athens, Greece. He competed at the 1896 Summer Olympics in Athens. Damaskos competed in the pole vault.  He tied with fellow Greek Ioannis Theodoropoulos for third place in the event, with a height of 2.60 metres.

References

External links

Year of birth missing
Year of death missing
Greek male pole vaulters
Athletes (track and field) at the 1896 Summer Olympics
19th-century sportsmen
Olympic athletes of Greece
Olympic bronze medalists for Greece
Olympic bronze medalists in athletics (track and field)
Medalists at the 1896 Summer Olympics
Athletes from Athens
Place of death missing
19th-century Greek people